The Rogers House is a historic house at 400 West 18th Street in Little Rock, Arkansas.  It is a large two story brick building, with an eclectic combination of Georgian Revival and American Craftsman features.  It was designed by Arkansas architect Charles L. Thompson and completed in 1914.  It has a green tile hip roof with extended eaves that show Craftsman style rafter ends, and is pierced by gabled dormers, which also have extended eaves, with large brackets for support.  A half-round entry portico projects from the front, supported by monumental fluted Ionic columns.  The house is one of Thompson's more imposing designs.

The house was listed on the National Register of Historic Places in 1982.

See also
National Register of Historic Places listings in Little Rock, Arkansas

References

Houses on the National Register of Historic Places in Arkansas
Colonial Revival architecture in Arkansas
Houses completed in 1914
Houses in Little Rock, Arkansas
National Register of Historic Places in Little Rock, Arkansas
Historic district contributing properties in Arkansas